John George Reger (September 11, 1931 – September 19, 2013) was a National Football League linebacker for the Pittsburgh Steelers and the Washington Redskins, and participated in three Pro Bowls during his 12-year career.  Reger played college football at the University of Pittsburgh. He died in Tampa, Florida in 2013.

References

1931 births
2013 deaths
American football linebackers
Pittsburgh Panthers football players
Pittsburgh Steelers players
Washington Redskins players
Eastern Conference Pro Bowl players